Singing All Along is a 2016 Chinese television series produced by Ruby Lin, starring Lin and Yuan Hong. Set in 1st-century imperial China, the drama is based on Li Xin's (李歆) 2007–2009 romantic novel series Xiuli Jiangshan (秀丽江山) and focuses on the relationship between Liu Xiu (Emperor Guangwu), a peasant-turned-Eastern Han dynasty founder, and Yin Lihua (Empress Guanglie), the love of his life. Although the original novel involved time travel, the television series does not contain those parts.

Filming began in October 2013 in Xiangshan County, Zhejiang, China with a budget of ¥150 million (over 24 million). The show premiered on Jiangsu Television on 21 July 2016.

Synopsis
In 22 AD, the peasant brothers Liu Yan and Liu Xiu led a rebel force to overthrow the oppressive Xin empire and to restore the Han dynasty. Yin Lihua, their beautiful childhood friend, joined their fight. During the bloody battles, Liu Xiu and Yin faced death many times together before the Xin empire was finally toppled. In 23, Liu Yan was seen by the new Han emperor Liu Xuan as a threat and killed. Fearing he would be next, Liu Xiu, with the help of his new bride Yin, managed to have Liu Xuan assign him to a territory beyond Liu Xuan's reach.

However, developing a power base of his own proved difficult. In 24, Liu Xiu encountered a dilemma: in order to enter a military alliance with a mighty regional warlord, he needed to marry the warlord's niece Guo Shengtong and break his vows to Yin. Meanwhile, Yin discovered that Liu Xuan also had feelings for her. When Yin finally reunited with her husband in 25, Liu Xiu was already the new emperor who had just captured the capital; with Guo, a woman he did not love, as his new wife. As the empire remained divided, naming Guo the empress seemed the ideal choice politically, but Liu Xiu's heart never left Yin. Amid a struggle for power, war, and intrigues, could their love survive?

Cast

Main
 Ruby Lin as Yin Lihua, Empress Guanglie of Han
 Yuan Hong as Liu Xiu, Emperor Guangwu of Han
 Yu Bo as Liu Xuan, the Gengshi Emperor
 Zong Fengyan as Liu Yan, Liu Xiu's eldest brother
 Kenny Kwan as Deng Yu, first of the Yuntai 28 generals
 Li Jiahang as Feng Yi, seventh of the Yuntai 28 generals
 Wang Yuanke as Guo Shengtong, Liu Xiu's second wife

Yin family
 Ren Quan as Yin Lu, Lihua's father
 Qi Wei as Cai Weiyue, Lihua's mother
 Xu Yang as Lady Deng, Yin Shi's mother
 Wang Yu as Yin Shi, Lihua's elder half-brother
 Liu Yuexin as Lady Liu, Yin Shi's wife
 Mao Zijun as Yin Xing, Lihua's younger brother
 Queenie Tai as Hupo, Yin Xing's concubine
 Liu Chenyi as Yin Jiu, Lihua's youngest brother
 Hu Kun as Deng Chen, Lihua's cousin
 Hong Siao-ling as Deng Chan, Deng Chen's younger sister
 Lee Li-chun as Cai Shaogong, Lihua's maternal uncle
 Wu Jinyan as Xu Yanzhi, Lihua's servant
 Zhou Bin as Yuchi Jun
 Guo Ruixi as Yuchi Shanan, Lihua's servant

Liu Xiu's family

 Li Jinsheng as Liu Chang
 Yue Junling as Liu Liang, Liu Xiu's uncle
 Tian Miao as Lady Fan, Liu Xiu's mother
 Wang Bin as Liu Zhong, Liu Xiu's elder brother
 Zheng Yijiang as Liu Huang, Liu Xiu's eldest sister
 Chi Lijing as Liu Yuan, Liu Xiu's elder sister & Deng Chen's wife
 Bai Huizi as Liu Boji, Liu Xiu's younger sister & Li Tong's wife
 Dai Xuyi as Liu Jia, Liu Xiu's cousin
 Lu Quanyu as Liu Zhang, Liu Yan's eldest son
 Yu Bingxuan as Liu Xing, Liu Yan's second son
 Qiu Shuang as Liu Qiang, Liu Xiu's eldest son by Shengtong
 Chen Boyi as Liu Fu, Liu Xiu's second son by Shengtong
 Zhao Wenhao as Liu Yang, Liu Xiu's fourth son by Lihua
 Ye Xuanchen as Liu Heng, Liu Xiu's ninth son by Lihua
 Zhao Yuwu as Fan Zhong, Liu Xiu's maternal grandfather
 Cao Jiqiang as Fan Hong, Liu Xiu's maternal uncle
 Wang Chenyixian as Liu Liliu, Liu Xiu's daughter by Shengtong
 Liu Chengming as Liu Yang, Shengtong's maternal uncle
 Wang Lin as Lady Liu, Shengtong's mother
 Liu Changde as Guo Kuang, Shengtong's elder brother
 Deng Ning as Liu Ji
 Shen Jianing as Yingluo, Shengtong's servant

Yuntai 28 generals

 Cai Heng as Wu Han, second of the Yuntai 28 generals
 Jin Hao as Geng Yan, fourth of the Yuntai 28 generals
 Cui Tonghe as Kou Xun, fifth of the Yuntai 28 generals
 Zhao Changzhou as Cen Peng, sixth of the Yuntai 28 generals
 Xin Xin as Zhu Hu, eighth of the Yuntai 28 generals
 Liu Jun as Zhai Zun, ninth of the Yuntai 28 generals
 Liu Yang as Ge Yan, 11th of the Yuntai 28 generals
 Wang Liang as Yao Qi, 12th of the Yuntai 28 generals
 Zhang Shuo as Geng Chun, 13th of the Yuntai 28 generals
 Jiang Zhenhao as Zang Gong, 14th of the Yuntai 28 generals
 Wang Jinduo as Ma Wu, 15th of the Yuntai 28 generals
 Ruan Jingtian as Liu Long, 16th of the Yuntai 28 generals
 Yao Qi as Wang Liang, 18th of the Yuntai 28 generals
 Wei Tianci as Fu Jun, 21st of the Yuntai 28 generals
 Wang Zirui as Wang Ba, 23rd of the Yuntai 28 generals
 Wang Han as Ren Guang, 24th of the Yuntai 28 generals
 Lin Junli as Li Zhong, 25th of the Yuntai 28 generals
 Du Yuanzao as Wan Xiu, 26th of the Yuntai 28 generals
 Shao Jia as Pi Tong, 27th of the Yuntai 28 generals
 Chen Xiaotao as Liu Zhi, 28th of the Yuntai 28 generals

Liu Xuan's family

 Liu Yitong as Lady Han, Liu Xuan's wife then concubine
 Sun Xiaoxiao as Lady Zhao, Liu Xuan's concubine
 Wu Hanfeng as Liu Qiu, Liu Xuan's eldest son by Lady Han
 Xu Zizheng as Liu Li, Liu Xuan's third son by Lady Han
 Gao Sen as Zhao Meng, Lady Zhao's father
 Chen Junhan as Zhao Xin
 Zhao Wei as Zhu Wei
 You Yong as Wang Chang
 Zhang Jingjia as Zhang Ang
 Zhang Jinglun as Cheng Dan
 Chen Tao as Wang Feng
 Liu Jianwei as Wang Kuang
 Pang Tanwei as Xie Gong
 Ma Kun as Chen Mu
 Chen Yajun as Li Shu
 Liu Shuai as Shen Tujian
 Liu Sihan as Cui'er, Lady Zhao's servant

Xin dynasty
 Liu Xinyi as Wang Mang
 Zhong Lin as Wang Xun, Wang Mang's nephew
 Sun Mingming as Ju Wuba
 Yang Jun as Wang Yi
 Liu Zhiyun as Yan You
 Tang Zhiyang as Zhen Fu

Li family
 Li Zhuolin as Li Tong
 Zhang Junzhu as Li Jun, Li Tong's younger sister
 Xiao Haoran as Li Yi, Li Tong's cousin
 Zhang Hongge as Li Song, Li Tong's second cousin

Hebei
 Xu Feng as Liu Lin
 Chang Jin as Wang Lang

Feng family
 Cui Liming as Feng Yi's father
 Zheng Jiaxue as Lady Lü, Feng Yi's second wife
 Reyizha Alimjan as Ding Rou, Feng Yi's concubine
 Zhang Yu as Feng Zhang, Feng Yi's son

Other
 Qin Junjie as Deng Feng, Deng Chen's nephew
 Ma Tianyu as Yan Ziling
 Sun Honglei as Guo Xian
 Zheng Yecheng as Deng Yu (young)

Soundtrack
 Opening theme song: "Beautiful Rivers and Mountains" (秀丽江山) by Van Fan
 Ending theme song: "Beauty and the Land" (红颜江山) by Ruby Lin

International broadcast

References

External links
 Official Micro-blog
 Japanese official site

2016 Chinese television series debuts
2016 Chinese television series endings
Alternate history television series
Chinese historical television series
Chinese romance television series
Cultural depictions of Chinese men
Cultural depictions of Chinese women
Jiangsu Television original programming
Television series by H&R Century Pictures
Television series set in Imperial China
Television series set in the Eastern Han dynasty
Television shows based on Chinese novels